Svecia (branded SVECIA) is a Swedish Screen printing brand. It originated over 60 years ago, when a Swedish screen printer asked Mr. Åke Svantesson of "Svantesson & Co" to repair a Scottish 'McCormick' screen printing machine he had bought before World War Two. Mr. Svantesson, an engineer who specialized in making precision components for the aircraft and reactor industries, did such a good job that he was asked to design and construct a new mechanized screen printer.

Svantesson produced an innovative machine with a moving table – the principle behind the now well-known and patented Sveciamatic. It was an immediate success. Large-scale production began in order to meet the growing demand, and Svecia Silkscreen Maskiner AB was later founded.

Today, over 5,000 Sveciamatic machines are still in use, and what became Svecia AB has installed over 16,000 screen printers worldwide.

History 

 1948: Svantesson & Co. founded in Stockholm, Sweden- precision manufacture for the aircraft and reactor industries - repair and design improvements of screen printing machines
 1950: Launch of innovative 4-post machine with sliding table – the Sveciamatic – raises screen printing reliability to new levels
 1962: Svecia Silkscreen Maskiner AB founded
 1970: Worldwide launch of the SAM 4-gripper machine signals a new era in quality multi-color screen printing
 1974: New development and manufacturing plant opens in Norsborg, Stockholm
 1982: Innovative, top performing shuttle gripper machine – the Printmaster – launched
 1986: Plant expansion
 1995: Launch of SAMX multi-color concept pioneers energy-saving UV-flash curing
 1998: Traction AB, a strong Swedish industrial group, becomes sole owner of Svecia AB
 2009: Svecia stops production of screen printing machines and is reorganized

At its height, SVECIA owned manufacturing and/or activities in several countries including Sweden, United States, Germany, France, Italy, and Hong Kong.  For many years earlier, SVECIA had been the leading developer of screen printing technology and the world's leading screen printing brand in graphical printing. The machines have been used for printing posters, packing material, glass, technical applications, and many more applications.

SVECIA got into problems when patents for the unique design expired, and also after developing 4 and 5 colour machines but meeting a completion from manufacturers who got subsidiaries. 
Today the name SVECIA for the purpose of screen printing is owned by the owner of the SVECIA UK company. The old main company is a sleeping company and its service and spare part company has had a management buyout, now giving service to machines worldwide.

References

External links 

 

Printing devices